Vaneq-e Sofla (also Romanized as Vāneq-e Soflá; also known as Vāneq and Vāneq-e Pā’īn) is a village in Molla Yaqub Rural District, in the Central District of Sarab County, East Azerbaijan Province, Iran. At the 2006 census, its population was 252, in 50 families.

References 

Populated places in Sarab County